Anayit Beyk (also Romanized as ʿAnyāīt Beyḵ) is a village in Rahjerd-e Sharqi Rural District, Salafchegan District, Qom County, Qom Province, Iran. At the 2006 census, its population was 152, in 50 families.

References 

Populated places in Qom Province